Antonio Gin (born 12 June 1955) is a Mexican boxer. He competed in the men's lightweight event at the 1972 Summer Olympics.

References

1955 births
Living people
Lightweight boxers
Mexican male boxers
Olympic boxers of Mexico
Boxers at the 1972 Summer Olympics
Place of birth missing (living people)
Boxers from Baja California
Sportspeople from Mexicali